Daniel S. Butler is the second Assistant Deputy Director of National Intelligence for Open Source (ADDNI/OS). As such, he is responsible for developing strategic direction, establishing policy and managing fiscal resources for open source exploitation as well as document and media exploitation for the Office of the Director of National Intelligence (ODNI).

Air Force Office of Special Investigations
Prior to joining the ODNI, Mr. Butler was executive director of the U.S. Air Force Office of Special Investigations (AFOSI), at Andrews Air Force Base, MD. In this capacity he served as adviser to the AFOSI Commander, oversaw the AFOSI Special Investigations Career Program and was responsible for executive-level policy coordination, liaison, and representation to national and international organizations.

Naval Criminal Investigative Service
Mr. Butler worked for seven years at Headquarters Naval Criminal Investigative Service in Washington, D.C., where he was Deputy Assistant Director for Government Liaison and Public Affairs, and executive assistant to the Director and Coordinator of Strategic Planning. He was appointed to the Senior Executive Service in December 2000.

US Navy
Mr. Butler served on active duty with the United States Navy from 1981 to 1991 as an intelligence officer. After his release from the Navy in 1991, he served as a Naval Reserve officer assigned to the Joint Military Intelligence College as an adjunct professor. He retired from the Naval Reserve in 2002.

References

Further reading
Washington Times – CIA mines 'rich' content from blogs 19 April 2006
Government Computer News – Intelligence units mine the benefits of public sources 20 March 2006

Living people
American civil servants
Open-source intelligence
Place of birth missing (living people)
Year of birth missing (living people)
Naval Criminal Investigative Service people
United States Air Force Office of Special Investigations
Naval Criminal Investigative Service agents
Assistant Deputy Director of National Intelligence for Open Source